The Indigenous Voice to Parliament, officially the Aboriginal and Torres Strait Islander Voice (also known as the Voice to Parliament or simply The Voice) is a proposed advisory body in Australia. It is to comprise Indigenous Australians and (under the current proposal) will have the power to "make representations to Parliament and the Executive government on matters relating to Aboriginal and Torres Strait Islander Peoples".
The Albanese Government has begun the process for the  inclusion of the body in the Constitution of Australia by way of a referendum, currently scheduled for late 2023. 

The proposal for the Voice to Parliament was formally announced in 2017 in the Uluru Statement from the Heart, delivered by the First Nations National Constitutional Convention which met at Uluru. The concept was rejected by the Turnbull government over concerns that it would be "seen as third chamber of parliament", and also did not receive the support of the Labor Opposition. After Scott Morrison became prime minister of Australia in August 2018, the Morrison Government proposed the "Indigenous voice to government" in October 2019, which would introduce a body via legislation, without changing the Constitution. The process by which the channel would be established was known as the Indigenous voice co-design process. The Senior Advisory Group was set up under Minister for Indigenous Australians, Ken Wyatt.

With a change of government on 23 May 2022, new prime minister Anthony Albanese promised in his victory speech that a referendum to decide the Indigenous Voice to Parliament enshrined in the Constitution would be held within his term of office. In July 2022 he outlined further plans regarding the referendum, and proposed that the advisory group be named the Aboriginal and Torres Strait Islander Voice. The new process is being overseen by Labor's Minister for Indigenous Australians Linda Burney. Whilst the Peter Dutton led Opposition Liberal Party has thus far reserved its position on the referendum pending further details from the Labor Government on the nature of the proposed Voice, their junior Coalition partner, the Nationals have declared themselves against the proposal, with Aboriginal Senator for the Northern Territory Jacinta Price arguing that it will enshrine a racially divisive bureaucracy into the Constitution, that cannot be dismantled.

Background
The ancestors of today's Aboriginal Australians first arrived on the Australian continent around 60,000 years ago. Gradually they settled the whole continent of Sahul (which incorporated modern Australia, Tasmania and New Guinea), forming hundreds of language groups, and living millennia in relative isolation. There is some non-conclusive evidence of Indian genetic contribution around 4,000 years ago. Around 10,000 years ago global sea level rose, separating mainland Aboriginal peoples, Aboriginal Tasmanians, Torres Strait Islanders and Papuan peoples (in New Guinea) from each other. There was significant contact between northern Aboriginal people and Makassar people from the 1600s until 1907.

The First Fleet of British settlers arrived in 1788, and the British gradually settled the entire Australian mainland and Tasmania. There were no treaties signed between the British and Indigenous Australian peoples, instead the British established control after a series of violent conflicts known as Frontier Wars. Along with various epidemics (eg: flu, smallpox) and starvation, this led to drastic population decline among Indigenous peoples during the 19th century.

The Commonwealth of Australia with its Australian Constitution was founded on 1 January 1901, gathering together the six former British colonies following a series of referenda in which all Indigenous women (except from those is Western Australia and South Australia) and non-propertied Indigenous men in Western Australia and Queensland could not take part. Indigenous Australians became British subjects upon assertion of British sovereignty to their land and became Australian citizens in 1948, along with all other Australians. Until the 1960s, Indigenous Australians voting rights and their right to stand for Australian Parliaments were limited. 

Since 1973, there have been four elected national representative indigenous bodies advising Australian governments. National Aboriginal Consultative Committee, from 1972 to 1977, The National Aboriginal Conference from 1977 to 1985, the Aboriginal and Torres Strait Islander Commission from 1990 to 2004 and the National Congress of Australia's First Peoples from 2009 to 2019. The lack of credibility and legitimacy, funding disputes, allegations of corruption and disagreements between Indigenous peoples, the bodies and the government on what role the bodies should play eventually led to their dissolution.

Indigenous Australians in Parliament

The rights of indigenous Australians to vote and stand for Parliament faced uneven restrictions across state and federal jurisdictions up until the 1960s. Up until the election of the second Menzies Government in 1949, Indigenous people were still excluded from voting in Federal Elections in Queensland and Western Australia because of state legislation. Subsequently, Menzies dismantled remaining restrictions on Federal voting rights, commencing with Aboriginal ex-servicemen in 1949, and concluding with the 1962 Commonwealth Electoral Act, which granted all indigenous people the option to enrol and vote in federal elections. Queensland became the last state to remove restrictions on state voting in 1965.

The first Aboriginal parliamentarians began to emerge at a state level from 1969 and, in 1971, Liberal Neville Bonner entered the Senate, as representative for Queensland. He was the first Aboriginal Federal Parliamentarian. Indigenous representation in Australian State and Federal Parliaments has grown markedly in the 21st century. In 2010, Liberal Ken Wyatt became the first Aboriginal member of the House of Representatives. In 2019, he became the first Aboriginal Cabinet Minister. In 2013, Northern Territory Chief Minister Adam Giles of the Country Liberal Party became the first Aboriginal to lead an Australian State or Territory. The 2022 Australian federal election resulted in a record 11 Aboriginal parliamentarians, representing 4.8% of all parliamentarians, which is higher than the Indigenous Australian population of 3.3%.

Elected voices to Parliament

The National Aboriginal Consultative Committee (NACC) was created in February 1973 by the Whitlam government's Minister of Aboriginal Affairs, Gordon Bryant, with the help of Charles Perkins. Its principal function was to advise the Department of Aboriginal Affairs (DAA) and the Minister on issues of concern to Aboriginal and Torres Strait Islander peoples. Its members were elected by Indigenous people, who had a turnout of 78% of the 36,338 people on its electoral roll, in November 1973. While it maintained a good relationship with Bryant, it had strong detractors in the DAA. While both the NACC and the government used the language of self-determination, the NACC saw itself as a legislative body while the government expected them to be purely advisory. This along with other conflicts over the name of the organisation and funding levels and control led to the end of the organisation. The Fraser Government commissioned the Hiatt Committee review of the body in 1976, which concluded that it had not functioned as a consultative committee or been effective in providing advice to government or in making its activities known to most Aboriginal people. 

To address its perceived failings, the body was reconstituted in 1977 as the National Aboriginal Congress (NAC). Changes included a move to indirect voting of members through regional representatives, a lower budget and a more explicit advisory role. The Hawke Government commissioned the Coombs Review into the NAC in 1983, and found that the body was not held in high regard by the Aboriginal community and was failing to influence government.  In 1985, a Commonwealth Auditor-General audit found financial mismanagement and irregularities and breaches of its charter and rules. Indigenous critics focused on the body's role as a mere "talk shop" and the lack of engagement with Indigenous communities. The body was abolished by the Hawke government in 1985.

ATSIC was the next elected body that provided an Indigenous voice to government. It also had responsibility and funding for administering Indigenous programs and service delivery. It was established by the Hawke government on 5 March 1990 through the Aboriginal and Torres Strait Islander Commission Act 1989. It was successful in some areas as being a combined deliver of services, however the body's low voter turnout often below 25%, allegations of corruption, and a lack of government support led to the demise of the organisation. ATSIC was abolished by the Howard government with the support of the Beazley Labor opposition on 24 March 2005. 

Prime Minister Howard and Indigenous Affairs Minister Amanda Vanstone announced in 2004: "We believe very strongly that the experiment in separate representation, elected representation, for indigenous people has been a failure", and proposed to establish a consultation model based on appointment of "distinguished indigenous people to advise the Government on a purely advisory basis". This body was established as the National Indigenous Council (NIC) in November that year.

A government inquiry into the demise of ATSIC recommended in March 2005 that the government appointed NIC "'be a temporary body, to exist only until a proper national, elected representative body is in place". The Aboriginal and Torres Strait Islander Social Justice Commissioner specifically called for a more representative voice in the Australian Human Rights Commission's Social Justice Reports of 2006 and 2008.

In early 2008, the NIC was disbanded, and in December that year, the Rudd government asked the Human Rights Commission to develop a new elected Indigenous representative body. This was announced as the National Congress of Australia's First Peoples in November 2009. The Congress was established as a body independent of government, aiming to avoid the problems ATSIC had. According to Warren Mundine, "where its predecessors were marred by conflict and controversy, Congress struggled with relevance. Fewer than 10,000 Indigenous people signed up as members to elect Congress delegates." The Abbott government cut off the main funding stream for the Congress in 2013. It went into voluntary administration in June 2019, before ceasing completely in October 2019.

Calls for a new voice came from the Cape York Institute in 2012 and 2015. The institute's Noel Pearson formulated the need and rationale for constitutional recognition in his 2014 contribution A Rightful Place: Race, Recognition and a More Complete Commonwealth for Quarterly Essay.

Indigenous Australians in the Constitution

Since 1967, the Australian Constitution grants the Federal Government powers to make laws for indigenous Australians. The Liberal Holt Government called a referendum in 1967 referendum to "omit certain words relating to the people of the Aboriginal race in any State and so that Aboriginals are to be counted in reckoning the Population". Over 90% of Australians voted yes in the referendum and from then on Indigenous Australians were counted in the population in the allocation of members of parliament.

Following the 1998 Australian Constitutional Convention, the Howard Government sought to have reference to Indigenous Australians included in a new Preamble to the Constitution. The proposed preamble included the words: "We the Australian people commit ourselves to … honouring Aborigines and Torres Strait Islanders, the nation's first people, for their deep kinship with their lands and for their ancient and continuing cultures which enrich the life of our country", however the preamble was rejected in a 1999 referendum.

On 16 October 2007, Prime Minister John Howard promised to hold a referendum on constitutional recognition, and then Labor leader Kevin Rudd gave bipartisan support.

On 8 November 2010 Prime Minister Julia Gillard announced plans for a referendum on the issue. At this time, the Expert Panel on Constitutional Recognition of Indigenous Australians was formed to determine how best to do this. In January 2012, the panel released their final report, which did not recommend the establishment of a new representative body.

The Abbott Government committed itself to pursuing recognition of Indigenous people in the Constitution. In November 2012, the all-party Joint Select Committee on Constitutional Recognition of Aboriginal and Torres Strait Islander Peoples was announced, and first met in 2014. It was chaired by Liberal MP Ken Wyatt. Its final report of June 2015 noted Noel Person's and others' requests for stronger forms of Indigenous representation, however did not recommend that a new body for this purpose be created.

Abbott said he hoped the wording for a referendum could be concluded in 2016, for a referendum vote in 2017. The referendum was not implemented by the successor Turnbull Government, and debate shifted towards formation of a constitutionally recognised advisory body.

A constitutional voice to Parliament

An Indigenous Voice 
On 7 December 2015 a 16-member Referendum Council was appointed by Liberal prime minister Malcolm Turnbull and the ALP's Bill Shorten. In October 2016, the Council released the Discussion Paper on Constitutional Recognition of Aboriginal and Torres Strait Islander Peoples which included a call for "An Indigenous voice". The Council then met with over 1,200 people. This led to the First Nations National Constitutional Convention on 26 May 2017, whose delegates collectively composed the Uluru Statement from the Heart. This statement included the request, "We call for the establishment of a First Nations Voice enshrined in the Constitution."

On 13 June 2017, the Referendum Council released their final report. This included the following recommendationThat a referendum be held to provide in the Australian Constitution for a representative body that gives Aboriginal and Torres Strait Islander First Nations a Voice to the Commonwealth Parliament. One of the specific functions of such a body, to be set out in legislation outside the Constitution, should include the function of monitoring the use of the heads of power in section 51(xxvi) and section 122. The body will recognise the status of Aboriginal and Torres Strait Islander peoples as the first peoples of Australia.In response to this, the federal government established the Joint Select Committee on Constitutional Recognition relating to Aboriginal and Torres Strait Islander Peoples in March 2018. It was tasked with reviewing the findings of the Uluru Statement delegates, Referendum Council and the two earlier constitutional recommendation bodies. The committee published its final report in November 2018, including four recommendations. The first of which was "In order to achieve a design for The Voice that best suits the needs and aspirations of Aboriginal and Torres Strait Islander peoples, the Committee recommends that the Australian government initiate a process of co-design with Aboriginal and Torres Strait Islander peoples."

The Select Committee stated in the report that the delegates at the 2017 Convention "understood that the primary purpose of The Voice was to ensure that Aboriginal and Torres Strait Islander voices were heard whenever the Commonwealth Parliament exercised its powers to make laws under section 51(xxvi) and section 122 of the Constitution". That is, laws made specifically regarding Australian Indigenous people or for the Northern Territory, which has a high proportion of Indigenous people.

Co-design of the Voice

Ken Wyatt 

On 30 October 2019, Ken Wyatt , Minister for Indigenous Australians in the Morrison government, announced the commencement of a "co-design process" aimed at providing an Indigenous voice to government. The Senior Advisory Group (SAG) was co-chaired by Professor Tom Calma , chancellor of the University of Canberra, and Professor Dr Marcia Langton, associate provost at the University of Melbourne, and was to comprise a total of 20 leaders and experts from across the country. There was some scepticism about the process from the beginning, with the criticism that it did not honour the Uluru Statement from the Hearts plea to "walk with us in a movement of the Australian people for a better future". According to Michelle Grattan, "...it is notable that it is calling it a 'voice to government' rather than a 'voice to parliament. Prime Minister Scott Morrison rejected the proposal in the Uluru Statement for a voice to parliament to be put into the Australian Constitution; instead, the voice will be enshrined in legislation. The government also said it would run a referendum during its present term about recognising Indigenous people in the Constitution "should a consensus be reached and should it be likely to succeed".

The models for the voice were planned to be developed in two stages:
First, two groups, one local and regional and the other a national group, will create models aimed at improving local and regional decision-making, and identifying how best federal government can record Indigenous peoples' views and ideas. The groups consist mainly of Indigenous members.
Consultations will be held with Indigenous leaders, communities and stakeholders to refine the models developed in the first stage.

Wyatt said that he doesn't mind what models are used, and they may vary across the country. His prime targets are suicide prevention and Closing the Gap. A meeting with Prime Minister Scott Morrison, senior ministers and peak Aboriginal community representatives had agreed on "priority reforms", which included greater Aboriginal involvement in decision-making and service delivery at all levels, and a commitment to ensuring that "all mainstream government agencies and institutions undertake systemic and structural transformation to contribute to closing the gap". Wyatt said that he would need to manage expectations on all sides as he seeks to build a consensus on the matter.

Three groups 
The original other members of the Senior Advisory Group (SAG) (besides Langton and Calma) included, among others, Frank Brennan, Josephine Cashman, Mick Gooda, Chris Kenny, Vonda Malone, June Oscar, Noel Pearson, Pat Turner, and Galarrwuy Yunupingu. The first meeting of the group was held in Canberra on 13 November 2019. It was planned that the SAG  would propose models for the voice by June 2020. Cashman was dismissed from the SAG on 28 January 2020 after her involvement with commentator Andrew Bolt in denouncing the Aboriginal identity of author Bruce Pascoe.

The National Co-design Group was announced on 15 January 2020, to be co-chaired by Donna Odegaard  and Ray Griggs . The other 15 members include Fred Chaney , Joseph Elu , Jeff Kennett , Fiona McLeod , and Gracelyn Smallwood .

On 4 March 2020 the third tier, the Local and Regional Co-Design Group, was announced, to be co-chaired by Peter Buckskin and National Indigenous Australians Agency senior official Letitia Hope. Members included Dr Getano Lui (Jnr), Albert McNamara, Aden Ridgeway and Marion Scrymgour. The group met for the first time in Sydney on 19 March 2020.

2021 SAG reports 
An interim report by the Senior Advisory Group led by Langton and Calma was delivered to the government in November 2020, and officially published on 9 January 2021. It included proposals that the government would be obliged to consult the Voice whenever it was going to create new legislation relating to race, native title or racial discrimination, where it would affect Indigenous Australians. However, the Voice would not be able to veto the enactment of such laws, or change government policies. The Voice would comprise either 16 or 18 members, who would either be elected either directly or come from the regional and local voice bodies. On the same day, Wyatt announced a second stage of co-design meetings lasting four months, involving more consultation with Indigenous people.

Calma reported in March 2021 that about 25 to 35 regional groups would be created, with a mechanism for individuals to pass ideas up the chain from local to regional.

In July 2021 the Indigenous Voice Co-design Process panel released its final report. It proposed that the Voice would "have a responsibility and right to advise the Australian Parliament and Government on national matters of significance to Aboriginal and Torres Strait Islander peoples". It provided detailed proposals on how both a "National Voice" and "Local & Regional Voices" would operate. The report did not cover changing the Constitution (and therefore requiring a referendum), as this was outside its terms of reference. In November it was announced that the report would be considered in parliament as soon as possible; however, sitting time was very limited before the summer break.

Anthony Albanese 

In the 2022 Australian federal election in May, a Labor government was elected, with Anthony Albanese to serve as prime minister of Australia. In his victory speech, Albanese said that a referendum to decide the Indigenous Voice to Parliament would be held within his term of office. Incoming Minister for Indigenous Australians Linda Burney would be overseeing the process, and she has said that there would need to be a far-reaching public education campaign to explain the voice to the Australian public before a referendum could be held. At that time (May 2022), it was still not clear exactly what a voice to parliament would look like; there were still differing views within Aboriginal and Torres Strait Islander communities about the proposal, and questions about whether an advisory body without the power of veto over parliament was ambitious enough.

At the Garma Festival of Traditional Cultures in July, Albanese spoke in more detail of the government's plans for a voice to parliament. He proposed to add the following three lines to the Constitution:

The wording of the second line contrasts with the wider advice function scope in Langton's and Calma's report.

He also proposed that the actioning referendum ask the following question:Do you support an alteration to the Constitution that establishes an Aboriginal and Torres Strait Islander Voice?It has been pointed out that the relevant Referendum (Machinery Provision) Act  requires a more detailed ballot wording and does not allow Albanese's simple phrasing.

Referendum preparation
The first meetings of the Referendum Working Group (RWG) and the Referendum Engagement Group (REG) were held in Canberra on 29 September 2022. The RWG, co-chaired by minister Linda Burney and special envoy Patrick Dodson, includes a broad cross-section of representatives from First Nations communities across Australia. They will provide advice to the Government on how best to ensure a successful Referendum and focus on the key questions that need to be considered in the coming months, including:
 The timing to conduct a successful referendum
 Refining the proposed constitutional amendment and question
 The information on the Voice necessary for a successful referendum

The RWG includes Ken Wyatt, Tom Calma, Marcia Langton, Megan Davis, Jackie Huggins, Noel Pearson, Pat Turner, Galarrwuy Yunupingu, Aboriginal and Torres Strait Islander Social Justice Commissioner June Oscar, and a number of other respected leaders and community members. The REG includes those on the RWG as well as other  Aboriginal and Torres Strait Islander representatives from across the country, including land councils, local governments and community-controlled organisations. Mick Gooda, Kado Muir, and Hannah McGlade are included in this larger group. They will provide advice about building community understanding, awareness and support for the referendum.

On 28 December 2022 at the Woodford Folk Festival, Prime Minister Albanese announced that the referendum would be held within a year.

On 21 February 2023 at Triple M in Port Hedland, the Prime Minister said that the referendum would be held between October and December.

From the Heart campaign
"From the Heart" is a campaign of the Cape York Institute designed to increase awareness and understanding of the Uluru Statement from the Heart and a constitutionally-enshrined voice to parliament, and to show that it is a fair and practical reform. Torres Strait Islander man Thomas Mayor, advocate for the Uluru Statement and the Voice, delivered the 2022 Vincent Lingiari Memorial Lecture on the topic. He drew parallels between Vincent Lingiari's struggle to be heard by governments back then, leading to the Wave Hill walk-off (Gurdindji strike), to what Indigenous peoples of Australia are experiencing today.

In April 2022, From the Heart suggested two dates for a referendum to decide whether to enshrine a voice to parliament in the Constitution: 27 May 2023 or 27 January 2024.

A new education campaign led by Roy Ah-See, called "History is Calling", was launched in early May 2022, to encourage Australians to answer the Uluru Dialogue's 2017 invitation, and to support the constitutionally-enshrined voice. In September 2022, From the Heart released a video ad to promote a yes vote for the Voice in a referendum, as part of the "History is Calling" campaign.

Opposition to the Voice proposal

Opposition to the proposal has been voiced from within both non-indigenous and indigenous communities, and from within both conservative and progressivist circles.

Voice No Case Committee 

The Voice No Case Committee's "Recognise a Better Way" campaign was launched in January 2023, and argues that the Voice is "the wrong way to recognise Aboriginal people or help Aboriginal Australians in need". The committee includes four Indigenous members and two former ministers, including former Howard Government Deputy Prime Minister John Anderson and former Keating Government minister turned hard-right activist Gary Johns. The Indigenous members of the committee are Northern Territory Country Liberal party senator Jacinta Price; former president of the ALP-turned Liberal candidate Warren Mundine, founder of the Northern Territory Kings Cross Station Ian Conway, and Bob Liddle, owner of Kemara enterprises. The committee views the idea of the Voice being added to the Constitution as "racially discriminatory" and instead proposes a three-point plan to recognise Aboriginal prior occupation in a preamble to the constitution, establish a parliamentary committee for native title holders, and support Aboriginal community-controlled organisations.

Juridical concerns 

Former High Court judge Ian Callinan has written that the Voice will operate "in substance a kind of a separate parliament" and "will give rise to many arguments and division, legal and otherwise", and has criticised the Albanese Government's "Orwellian" intent not to fund both sides of the public debate ahead of the referendum, but instead to fund a "public education program" to support its proposal. Callinan has called for clarification of the intended franchise and financial and judicial oversight methods. He predicts that the body will become party political, and that he foresees "a decade or more of constitutional and administrative law litigation arising out of a voice whether constitutionally entrenched or not … I can imagine any number of people and legal personalities in addition to the states who might plausibly argue that they have standing. Standing is a highly contestable matter."

The Coalition 

While the Opposition Leader Peter Dutton's Liberal Party is yet to declare a position (pending further detail from the Albanese Government on the nature of the proposal) their junior Coalition partner the Nationals have declared themselves against the proposal. Nationals leader David Littleproud announced on 28 November 2022 that "as the men and women who represent regional, rural and Indigenous and remote Australians … we don't believe this will genuinely close the gap…", saying the party instead believed in "empowering local Indigenous communities…  to give those communities the opportunities that those in metropolitan Australia enjoy every day". In supporting her leader's announcement, Aboriginal Senator for the Northern Territory Jacinta Price said that "What we need now is practical measures and we have to stop dividing our nation along the lines of race."  Dutton's queries on the nature of the voice have been characterised as both ensuring Australians have enough information on the proposal, but also trying to split the Yes vote along the lines of different models for a voice, as John Howard did with the 1999 Australian republic referendum.

Senator Price, along with former Liberal candidate for Gilmore Warren Mundine have been among the leading Aboriginal voices against the Uluru Statement and Albanese Government Voice proposal, arguing that it does not represent indigenous consensus, and that it will only create a new layer of bureaucratic management and interference by elites over the lives of indigenous people and communities, while overturning the principle of equal rights for all races under Australian law. In a 2022 book entitled Beyond Belief… Rethinking the Voice to Parliament, Senator Price wrote, "The globally unprecedented Voice proposal will divide Australia along racial lines… It will constitutionally enshrine the idea that Aboriginal people are perpetual victims - forever in need of special measures." Mundine wrote for the same publication, "The Voice sounds to me like more bureaucracy controlling Indigenous lives and bossing us around."

Former National Party leader Barnaby Joyce told Sky News Australia that the Voice to Parliament would do "real harm by dividing" the Australian population by race; that it would give unequal representation for "one group of people" due only to race, thus creating a divide in the population.

Whilst the constitutionally conservative John Howard and Tony Abbott Liberal–National Governments actively supported inserting recognition of indigenous Australians into the Constitution, both leaders have rejected the idea of creating a Constitutionally enshrined Voice to Parliament. Whilst in office, their successor Turnbull and Morrison Coalition governments also rejected the Voice proposal. In 2017, Turnbull declared in a joint statement with Attorney General George Brandis and Indigenous Affairs Minister Nigel Scullion that it "would inevitably become seen as a third chamber of parliament" and that "the Referendum Council provided no guidance as to how this new representative assembly would be elected or how the diversity of Indigenous circumstance and experience could be fairly or democratically represented". Moreover, the government does not believe such a radical change to our constitution's representative institutions has any realistic prospect of being supported by a majority of Australians in a majority of states. (Turnbull reversed his opposition to the proposal following the election of the Albanese Government.)

In November 2022, John Howard told The Australian newspaper that "people saw the 1967 referendum as a demonstration of our good faith. But people see the voice as creating potential divisions." Tony Abbott wrote for the same publication that he objected to the Voice proposal because it was "race based", would "vastly complicate" the difficulties of getting legislation passed and anything done; was a "vague-yet-portentous concept" that would invite High Court review and delay; and that ultimately, the cause of Reconciliation would be set back if the referendum fails, and that this was likely given the lack of bipartisan support as indicated by "new Coalition senator for the Northern Territory, the proud 'Celtic-Warlpiri Australian' woman Jacinta Price, [expressing] deep scepticism about a proposal with so much of the detail thus far omitted, with so much potential for ineffective posturing, and that defines people by racial heritage".

The National Party of Australia opposes the Voice as party policy. The decision led to Andrew Gee leaving the party to sit as an independent.

The Country Liberal Party opposes the Voice.

Minor parties and other notable opponents 
Independent Senator Lidia Thorpe, formerly representing the Australian Greens party, has described the Voice to Parliament referendum as a "waste of money", and said that it would be better to divert the funds into Indigenous communities, but Greens Leader Adam Bandt has dismissed her concerns and supports the Voice. Thorpe (and the Greens) have also said that a treaty with indigenous Australians should come first – not the Voice, and in January 2023 left the Greens party over differences with the rest of the party.  She has also expressed concerns that the Voice model will impact on Indigenous sovereignty. The conveners of the Greens’ First Nations advisory group "First Nations Network" Dr Tjanara Goreng Goreng and Dominic Wy Kanak, also oppose the voice. 

Pauline Hanson's One Nation opposes the Voice as party policy.

The conservative lobby group Advance Australia opposes the Voice.

Conservative academics Keith Windschuttle and David Flint oppose the Voice. Flint dedicated an episode of his TV series "Save the Nation" to the topic in 2022.

Professor Gary Foley, who co-founded the Aboriginal Tent Embassy opposes the voice.

Public opinion

National
Research commissioned by From the Heart and conducted by the C|T Group in June 2020 shows that a majority of Australians support a constitutionally-enshrined voice to parliament, and that this support has increased 7 percent in three months, from 49 percent in March to 56 percent in June 2020. There were 2000 participants in the survey, who were asked, "If a referendum were held today, how would you vote on the proposal to change the Constitution to set up a new body comprising Aboriginal and Torres Strait Islander people that gives advice to federal parliament on Aboriginal and Torres Strait Islander issues?". Only 17 percent said they would vote no, down 3 percent since March 2020.

The ABC's Vote Compass survey has included questions about a voice to parliament in both its 2019 and 2022 editions. In 2019, 64% of voters agreed with the establishment of a voice while 22% disagreed. Of these, 37% strongly agreed, 27% somewhat agreed, 13% were neutral, 10% somewhat disagreed, and 12% strongly disagreed. The 2022 edition of Vote Compass found that support had grown to 73% while opposition declined to 16%: 48% strongly agreed, 25% somewhat agreed, 10% were neutral, 7% somewhat disagreed, and 9% strongly disagreed.

Notes

Subnational

New South Wales

Victoria

Queensland

Western Australia

South Australia

Tasmania

Aboriginal and Torres Strait Islander Australians
A 20–24 January 2023 poll surveyed 300 Aboriginal and Torres Strait Islander Australians.

 80% supported the Voice (57% "very sure", 21% "fairly sure", 2% "not really sure")
 10% opposed
 10% undecided

The question posed was "Do you support an alteration to the Australian Constitution that establishes a Voice to parliament for Aboriginal and Torres Strait Islander people?", the poll was commissioned by The Uluru Dialogue group at University of New South Wales Law Centre, and conducted by polling company Ipsos. The sample was controlled for age, sex and location.

State and territory voices

ACT Aboriginal and Torres Strait Islander Elected Body 
The ACT Aboriginal and Torres Strait Islander Elected Body was established in 2008.

First People's Assembly of Victoria 
In November 2019, the First Peoples' Assembly of Victoria was first elected, consisting of 21 members representing Aboriginal Victorians, elected from five different regions in the state, and 10 members to represent each of the state's formally recognised traditional owner corporations (excluding the Yorta Yorta Nation Aboriginal Corporation, who declined to participate in the election process). This body provides an Indigenous voice to the Victorian parliament.

First Nations Voice to Parliament (South Australia) 

In May 2021, South Australian Premier Steven Marshall announced his government's intention to create the state's first Indigenous Voice to Parliament. After the election of a state Labor government in 2022, new premier Peter Malinauskas pledged to implement this state-based voice to parliament, as well as restarting treaty talks and greater investment in areas affecting Aboriginal people in the state.  In July 2022 Dale Agius was appointed as the state's first Commissioner for First Nations Voice, with the role commencing in August and responsible for liaising with federal government. Kokatha elder Dr Roger Thomas would continue as Commissioner for Aboriginal Engagement for a further six months.

In January 2023 the government secured the support of the Greens for a bill which would be debated in parliament later in the year. Kyam Maher, Attorney-General of South Australia and Minister for Aboriginal Affairs said that they expected to have the First Nations Voice to Parliament operational by the end of 2023. The process would include the election of 40 people by Aboriginal and Torres Strait Islander people enrolled to vote ore members specific to their geographic area, with 12 of these forming a statewide Voice, which would be entitled to address the parliament on any bill being debated. An open letter was sent in early January to Agius and Maher by Native Title Services SA on behalf of most of the native title bodies, voicing some concerns about aspects of the model, saying the proposal would bypass established individual native title groups' voices. Maher said later that their concerns would be taken into consideration, and the bill would ensure the Voice would not impinge on what the groups do, and would ensure the existence of a formal structure to take into account their views.

Stances of political parties

Summary

Independent parliamentarians

Position of the Coalition
Federally, the Liberals are primarily undecided on the issue, with leader Peter Dutton having repeatedly asked for more information. However, some Liberal MPs do have personal stances on the issue; many Moderates support the Voice while many members of the National Right faction oppose it.

The party's two state Premiers, Dominic Perrottet (New South Wales) and Jeremy Rockliff (Tasmania) openly support the Voice.

The party's other leaders, John Pesutto (Victoria), David Crisafulli (Queensland), Libby Mettam (Western Australia), David Speirs (South Australia; opposes state-level Voice) and Elizabeth Lee (ACT), remain undecided on the Voice.

The party's South Australian division opposes the state's version of the Voice to Parliament, but has not yet made a stance on the federal version. The Canberra Liberals have given its MPs a conscience vote on the issue.

The Nationals oppose the Voice on a federal level (although the party supports the Voice in New South Wales and Western Australia), while the Country Liberal Party remains split on the issue.

Stances of former Prime Ministers
While prime minister, Scott Morrison proposed a version of the Voice, but ruled out a referendum on Albanese's proposal as of 2022. Tony Abbott has openly given his opposition the Voice.

In August 2022, Malcolm Turnbull stated that despite his previous concerns, he would now vote in favour of Albanese's proposal. Kevin Rudd also supports the Voice to Parliament, stating that Abbott's stance on the issue was "wrong", and Paul Keating strongly supports the Voice, saying that the Albanese government should not postpone a referendum on the issue and should hold it in its first term.

Stances of public figures

In March 2023, Geelong Football Club captain and president of the AFL Players Association, Patrick Dangerfield backed the AFL's support of the "Yes Campaign". 

The University of Melbourne and the Australian Academy of Technological Sciences and Engineering released statements supporting the motion.

See also
Assembly of First Nations (Canada)
Australian Aboriginal sovereignty
Bureau of Indian Affairs (United States)
Indigenous treaties in Australia
Māori politics
Māori electorates
Māori wards and constituencies
New Zealand Māori Council
Te Puni Kōkiri

References

Further reading

External links

Morrison Government
History of Indigenous Australians
Indigenous Australian politics
Albanese Government
Proposals in Australia
Constitutional referendums in Australia